Encinal, California may refer to:
Former name of Alameda, California
Encinal, Santa Clara County, California
Encinal, Sutter County, California